Kolovai is a village on the Tongan island of Tongatapu. Its 2006 population was 4,098.

The village is notable for its lakalaka, the national dance of Tonga. A national monument has been proposed to preserve the site of the koka tree where members of the Tu'i Kanokupolu dynasty received investiture. It is home to a large colony of Pacific Flying Foxes, a species of fruit bat.

References

Populated places in Tonga
Tongatapu